"All Time Love" is a song performed by English singer Will Young. It was written by Jamie Hartman and produced by Stephen Lipson. The song was released as the second single from Young's third album, Keep On (2005), as his ninth single overall. "All Time Love" debuted and peaked number three on the UK Singles Chart, becoming Young's ninth and last consecutive top-five hit as well as his penultimate top-five hit.

Awards
The song was voted Song of the Year in the heat readers poll 2006. It was also shortlisted for the British Single award at the 2007 BRIT Awards, where it reached the final round of voting.

Music video
"All Time Love", directed by W.I.Z, shot in Havana, was also made into a mini movie which served as a music video. A second video for the song appears on CD2 of the single release, as well as the DualDisc version of Keep On. In this video, Young portrays a skywriter who has written the words "All Time Love" in the sky and then parachuted from his aircraft, which is seen crashing in the distance at the end of the video.

Track listings

Credits and personnel
 Tracy Ackerman – backing vocals
 Anne Dudley – conductor, strings arranger
 Jamie Hartman – piano, writer
 Stephen Lipson – bass guitar, producer
 Heff Moraes – engineer
 Mike Ross-Trevor – engineer
 Will Young – vocals

Charts

Weekly charts

Year-end charts

Certifications

Release history

References

External links
 

19 Recordings singles
2005 songs
2006 singles
Songs written by Jamie Hartman
Sony BMG singles
Will Young songs